Ab Bid (also Romanized as Āb Bīd) is a village in Tashan-e Gharbi Rural District, Tashan District, Behbahan County, Khuzestan Province, Iran. In 2006, its population was 43, in 7 families.

References 

Populated places in Behbahan County